Vahid Evazzadeh is a theatre director, writer, dramaturge and filmmaker based in Denmark and United Kingdom.

Performances

As director
 2018 – Uncle Fool with The Counter Institute, co-produced by Sydhavn Teater
 2015 – The Maids in Istanbul
 2014 – The Maids in Beijing
 2008–12 – HamletZar at Odin Teatret, Dance Base, Barbican Centre, Pavilion Dance South West etc.
 2011 – inferno
 2009 – Truth is Fragmented
 2000 – Mama Godzilla

As dramaturge
 2019 – Walk-Man with DON GNU Physical Theater
 2007 – @Work: No Title with TeaterKunst

Publication

Short Stories
 2018 – Six bullet holes in VisAvis No. 13
 2016 – Not Tonight in Friktion Magazin
 2014 – At Sidde og Læse I Min Blodige Bog Friktion Magazin

Film criticism
 2005 – Thelma & Louise in Filmmagasinet Ekko

Interviews

On Performing Arts
 2019 – Master the Craft First Interview by Tonia Stavrinou
 2019 – Η τέχνη θέλει ειλικρινείς προθέσεις
 2015 – In Conversation with Vahid Evazzadeh By Claire Zerhouni for Yabangee
 2009 – Theater is the Path to Freedom interview with Sue Balint first published in the Wheel Me Out magazine

On Culture, Politics and Society
 2019 – On The Role of Art in society video interview by Marijana Rimanic for Reshape research project
 2014 – Turning Margin into Center interview by Rita Júlia Sebestyén in The Migrationist

References

Year of birth missing (living people)
Living people
Iranian expatriates in Denmark
Iranian expatriates in the United Kingdom
Iranian theatre directors
Iranian filmmakers
21st-century Iranian short story writers
Dramaturges